Andrei Stelmakh (born March 15, 1990) is a Russian professional ice hockey goaltender. He is currently playing with PSK Sakhalin of the Asia League Ice Hockey (ALIH).

Stelmakh made his professional debut with HC Almaty during the 2012–13 Kazakhstan Hockey Championship season, playing 35 games. He also played one game for Admiral Vladivostok of the Kontinental Hockey League during the 2013–14 KHL season.

References

External links

1990 births
Living people
Admiral Vladivostok players
HC Almaty players
Russian ice hockey goaltenders
PSK Sakhalin players
Sportspeople from Khabarovsk